Gilda Jannaccone (born 12 March 1940 in Naples) is an Italian former middle distance runner.

Career
Jannaccone participated at the 1960 Summer Olympics. She has 19 caps from the national team from 1957 to 1965.

National records
 400 m: 60.9 ( Naples, 18 May 1957) - holder until 23 June 1957
 800 m: 2:08.9 ( Zagreb, 30 September 1964) - holder until 16 June 1966

Achievements

National titles
Gilda Jannaccone won the individual national championship 12 times.
6 wins on 800 metres (1958, 1959, 1960, 1961, 1962, 1963)
6 wins on cross country running (1958, 1959, 1960, 1961, 1962, 1963)

See also
 Italian Athletics Champions in women's 800 m

References

External links
 

1940 births
Living people
Italian female middle-distance runners
Athletes (track and field) at the 1960 Summer Olympics
Athletes from Naples
Olympic athletes of Italy
20th-century Italian women
21st-century Italian women